Anne Marie Tistler de Bosques (born 20 December 1932), is a former Miss Sweden titleholder and semi-finalist at Miss Universe 1952, model and actress. She emigrated to Mexico in 1952, where she married Gilberto Bosques Manjarrez. She appeared in films during the 1950s.

Appearances in films
 1954 - Divisionen
 1955 - Hunden och bilen
 1957 - Vägen genom Skå

References

External links
Ann-Marie Tistler – Svensk Filmdatabas

1930 births
Living people
Miss Universe 1952 contestants
Swedish beauty pageant winners
Swedish emigrants to Mexico